The Ford Union is a former joint venture of the Ford Motor Company, the Russian Lada importer Lada-OMC and the Belarusian government. It was located in Apčak near the city of Minsk in Belarus. Ford has invested a capital of US$10.000.000 for building this plant. So it was the most expensive plant of the Ford concern in Western Europe at this time. The company existed from 1997 up to 2000 when it was closed due to low sales.

The Ford Union was not a manufacturer, it was only an assembler of SKD kits. The vehicles assembled by the Belarusian plant can be identified by the manufacturer code Y4F on the start on the VIN and an R on the eleventh position for the plant identification.

The plant become well known on 23 July 1997 as president Alexander Grigoryevich Lukashenko was invited to a press conference with five strategically selected foreign journalists to discuss a predicted failure which later proved true.

Model overview

Sources

Ford of Europe
Car manufacturers of Belarus
Vehicle manufacturing companies established in 1997
Defunct manufacturing companies of Belarus